Choices is fourth and last solo EP by American musician and songwriter, Clint Lowery (under the name Hello Demons...Meet Skeletons). It was released on October 22, 2013. As well as the EP, Lowery is also releasing a limited edition deluxe of the complete HDMS series. The EP was preceded by the song, "Caved In," which was released in SoundCloud.com in September 2013.

Writing and production
Clint Lowery during an interview talked about sound of new album, described "It’s a lot like the Call Me No One project, mostly electric. Harder at times, but overall pretty chill in a sense. I think we covered such major ground on it." The album's instrumental and programming work was recorded at Architekt Music in Butler, NJ.

Track listing

Personnel
 Clint Lowery - Vocals, Guitar, Bass, Drums,  Producer
 Mike Ferretti - Mixing
 Kurt Wubbenhorst  - Composer, Additional Bass, Additional Drums, Programming
 Recorded and Mixed at Architekt Music in Butler, New Jersey
 Jill Colbert - Artwork

External links
Official Clint Lowery Website

References

2013 EPs
Clint Lowery albums
Hard rock EPs